St. Peter Church is a historic church at 720 Cleveland Ave., NW in Canton, Ohio.

It was built in 1875 and added to the National Register in 1990.

References

External links

 Official website

Roman Catholic churches completed in 1875
Churches in the Roman Catholic Diocese of Youngstown
Churches on the National Register of Historic Places in Ohio
Gothic Revival church buildings in Ohio
Churches in Stark County, Ohio
National Register of Historic Places in Stark County, Ohio
Churches in Canton, Ohio
Tourist attractions in Canton, Ohio
19th-century Roman Catholic church buildings in the United States